Andrew T. Seuss (born March 15, 1987) is an American professional stock car racing driver. He won two consecutive championships in 2014 and 2015 in the NASCAR Whelen Southern Modified Tour. Seuss has also competed in the NASCAR Cup Series, NASCAR Camping World Truck Series, Whelen Modified Tour, ARCA Menards Series and ARCA Menards Series East.

Racing career

Early years
Seuss started in go-kart racing, running at Sugar Hill Speedway in Weare, New Hampshire. He later moved up to late model racing.

Open-wheel series

Whelen Southern Modified Tour

Early years
Seuss started competing in 2006, at the age of 19. He ran four races in that season, finishing half of them and recording the best finish of fourth in his final start of the season at Motor Mile Speedway. In 2007, Seuss ran four more races, leading 116 of 157 laps and recording his first win at Music City Motorplex. However, he recorded two last place finishes, one because of withdrawal and one because of shock problems.

Full-time
In 2008, Seuss went full-time, grabbing his first pole in the second race of the season. However, he crashed out of that race en route to the last place finish. He won the final race of the season to cap off his first season with longtime team owner David Riggs, and his first season with Advance Auto Parts as a sponsor. In 2009, Seuss stayed with Riggs, scoring wins from the pole at Myrtle Beach Speedway and Caraway Speedway, as well as non-pole wins at South Boston Speedway and Lanier Speedway. He finished second in the series' point standings. In 2010, Advance Auto Parts departed as a sponsor, but Seuss and Riggs picked up Q Racing Oil as a primary sponsor. Seuss scored two wins, both at Caraway Speedway, but a last-race crash sent him from second to fourth in the point standings. In 2011, Seuss did not return to Riggs' team, instead of running the first four races with Brian Fishel and the final ten races with Eddie Harvey. Those final ten races included three poles and four wins, and Seuss once again finished as the series' runner-up in the point standings. For 2012, Seuss stayed with Harvey's team, but was plagued by inconsistency, scoring only one win and finishing fifth in points. With no full-season sponsor in 2013, Seuss soldiered on, not scoring his first win until the ninth race but then winning that one and the two after it to rally to third in the point standings.

Championship seasons
Ideal Finance signed on to sponsor Seuss in 2014, and Seuss responded with a first-race win, and not holding the top spot in the standings for only one race. He won his first championship that season on the back of a season in which he never finished a race outside of the top ten. In 2015, Seuss started with an opening-race crash, but rebounded by winning the race after that. He moved into the lead in the point standings after a win in the penultimate race at South Boston. A sixth-place finish in the final race of the season secured another championship for Seuss.

After the championships
Coming off back-to-back championships was no easy task, as new sponsors signed on for the beginning of the season. Seuss led over 40 laps in that opening race but finished fifth. The 2016 season included a pole and a win, as well as finishing in the top ten in every race and completing every lap of the season save for one at South Boston. However, a third consecutive title was not in the cards, as Seuss finished the season third in points, losing by about twenty to winner Burt Myers.

When the series folded after 2016, Seuss pursued a part-time Whelen Modified schedule and select races in other series.

Whelen Modified Tour
Seuss has been a part-time competitor in the series since 2006, never running more than six races a season. His first top five in the series came at New Hampshire Motor Speedway in 2013 driving for Eddie Harvey. In 2017, when the Southern Modified Tour disbanded, Seuss ran a partial schedule with Harvey and others while also running some ARCA Racing Series events.

Stock car racing

ARCA Menards Series
Seuss debuted in the ARCA Racing Series in 2015, driving the No. 76 for Bryan Dauzat at Talladega Superspeedway. Seuss finished 21st, two laps down. His second start came five races later, driving the No. 40 for Roger Carter, and he finished two positions higher than in his debut, recording a 19th at Chicagoland Speedway. In 2016, Seuss returned to Talladega, this time driving for Chris Our. However, brake issues hampered his efforts and he finished 31st. Seuss continued his superspeedway efforts with Our in 2017, running Daytona and Talladega, finishing second at Talladega just behind Justin Haley. The car Seuss ran at Daytona was originally from Diamond Ridge Motorsports and the 1997 NASCAR Busch Series.

K&N Pro Series East
Seuss made his debut K&N Pro Series East at New Hampshire Motor Speedway in 2017 behind the wheel of No. 31 Chevrolet SS for Marsh Racing. He started 15th and finished 13th.

Camping World Truck Series
In 2013, Seuss attempted to make his Camping World Truck Series debut at Rockingham Speedway for FDNY Racing, but failed to qualify. Two years later, he failed to qualify at Talladega Superspeedway. Seuss broke through in 2016, failing to qualify at Charlotte Motor Speedway with FDNY Racing's No. 28, but then got into the race when MAKE Motorsports sold the ride in their No. 1 entry to Seuss and FDNY Racing. Seuss completed only 20 laps until a crash sent him home in last place.

Monster Energy Cup Series
On June 28, 2019, it was announced that Seuss would make his Monster Energy NASCAR Cup Series debut at New Hampshire Motor Speedway in July, driving the team's No. 51 entry.

Xfinity Series
In October 2019, Seuss and Our Motorsports partnered to run the full 2020 NASCAR Xfinity Series schedule in the No. 02, with Seuss also working as the team's director of operations. However, after 16 races with Brett Moffitt primarily driving the car, Seuss left the team on July 22, 2020.

Personal life
Seuss attended Pinkerton Academy and New Hampshire Technical Institute. In 2014, shortly after finishing fifth in the season finale at Charlotte Motor Speedway to clinch the Southern Modified Tour championship, Seuss proposed to his girlfriend Jen. The two married in June 2015. Their first son Lyle was born in fall 2016. Seuss owns a boat repair business in Lake Norman when he is not racing.

Motorsports career results

NASCAR
(key) (Bold – Pole position awarded by qualifying time. Italics – Pole position earned by points standings or practice time. * – Most laps led. ** – All laps led.)

Monster Energy Cup Series

Camping World Truck Series

K&N Pro Series East

Whelen Modified Tour

Whelen Southern Modified Tour

ARCA Menards Series
(key) (Bold – Pole position awarded by qualifying time. Italics – Pole position earned by points standings or practice time. * – Most laps led.)

 Season still in progress
 Ineligible for series points

References

External links
 
 

1987 births
Living people
Hampstead, New Hampshire
Sportspeople from Rockingham County, New Hampshire
NASCAR drivers
ARCA Menards Series drivers
Racing drivers from North Carolina
Pinkerton Academy alumni